Tanjin Tisha is a Bangladeshi actress, model and television presenter. She has acted in television serials and dramas. She won Meril Prothom Alo Awards in Best Newcomer category for her performance in the drama U-Turn.

Background and career
Tisha was born to Abdul Kashem (d. 2022).

Tisha started her career through fashion shoot and ramp modelling in 2011. Tisha first modeled in an advertising campaign of Robi directed by Amitabh Reza Chowdhury in 2012. That was the turning point of her career. She walked in ramp for Tresemme Fashion Show at Bangabandhu International Conference Centre on 18 September 2015. She renewed her contract with Infinix for 2022.

Personal life
Tisha learned dancing in her childhood but her family stopped it for her education. She completed her HSC from Siddhesshori Girls High School and College.

Works

Television

Films

Music videos

Awards and nominations

References

External links

 

Living people
Bangladeshi film actresses
Bangladeshi television actresses
21st-century Bangladeshi actresses
Place of birth missing (living people)
1993 births
CJFB Performance Award Winners